Pettinain is a hamlet and civil parish in South Lanarkshire, Scotland,  east of Lanark. Bartholomew's Gazetteer of the British Isles described Pettinain in 1887 as "par. and vil., Lanarkshire, on river Clyde - par., 3900 ac., pop. 360; vil., 3 miles S. of Carstairs Junction; P.O".

Notable residents
Claudia Beamish, Scottish Labour Party MSP

References

Villages in South Lanarkshire
Civil parishes of Scotland